Sew the Winter to My Skin is a 2018 South African action film directed by Jahmil X.T. Qubeka. It was screened in the Contemporary World Cinema section at the 2018 Toronto International Film Festival. It was selected as the South African entry for the Best Foreign Language Film at the 91st Academy Awards, but was ultimately not nominated.

Cast
 Kandyse McClure as Golden Eyes
 Peter Kurth as Botha
 Dave Walpole as The Scarfaced Kid

See also
 List of submissions to the 91st Academy Awards for Best Foreign Language Film
 List of South African submissions for the Academy Award for Best Foreign Language Film

References

External links
 

2018 films
2018 action films
Afrikaans-language films
South African action films